Hans Huber (born 1 January 1934) is a boxer from Germany. He was born in Regensburg, Germany.

He competed for Germany in the 1964 Summer Olympics held in Tokyo, Japan and reached the final but lost to future heavyweight champion of the world Joe Frazier therefore finishing with a respectable silver medal. Hans lost a 3-2 decision after besting Abdul Rehman and Giuseppe Ros.

1964 Olympic results

Below are Hans Huber's results from the 1964 Olympic boxing tournament in Tokyo, Japan:

 Round of 16: bye
 Quarterfinal: defeated Abdul Rehman (Pakistan) by knockout
 Semifinal: defeated Giuseppe Ros (Italy) by a 4-1 decision
 Final: lost to Joe Frazier (USA) by a 2-3 decision (was awarded silver medal)

References

Sports-reference

1934 births
Living people
Olympic boxers of the United Team of Germany
Olympic silver medalists for the United Team of Germany
Boxers at the 1964 Summer Olympics
Olympic medalists in boxing
German male boxers
Medalists at the 1964 Summer Olympics
Heavyweight boxers